Horst Ehrmantraut (born 11 December 1955) is a German former professional football defender and manager.

Plastic chair
What is a very well known and characteristic feature of Ehrmantraut, is a plastic chair, from which he followed the matches. Not sitting on the regular bench, but aside near the ground, the legend came up, he is fixing and ruling the players in a mental way form this place. Later he told, that it was only because of a better concentration than on the crowded bench. Because of the promotion to the Bundesliga connected with Ehrmantraut's queer character, the chair became a cult status and was not disposed. Now, it is shown in the official Eintracht Frankfurt Museum in the Commerzbank-Arena (formerly known as 'Waldstadion') behind a vitrine.

References

External links
 
 Horst Ehrmantraut at eintracht-archiv.de 
 Picture of the plastic chair in the Museum

1955 births
German footballers
Association football defenders
Living people
People from Homburg, Saarland
FC 08 Homburg players
Eintracht Frankfurt players
Hertha BSC players
Hannover 96 managers
1. FC Saarbrücken managers
Eintracht Frankfurt managers
Bundesliga players
2. Bundesliga players
Bundesliga managers
2. Bundesliga managers
UEFA Cup winning players
SV Meppen managers
Footballers from Saarland
German football managers
West German footballers